Orthogonius hageni is a species of ground beetle in the subfamily Orthogoniinae. It was described by Oberthür in 1883.

References

hageni
Beetles described in 1883